Aadarsha Secondary English School is a day school in Saptari, Nepal. It follows the Secondary Education Examination and caters to students from nursery to grade ten.

History
Aadarsha was founded in 2001 by the local farmers of the area. It was established by a fund from its mother institution Aadarsha Bahumukhi Dugda Udpadan Sahakari Sanstha to provide quality education to farmer's children.

Infrastructure
It is a three-story structure with a canteen and a playground to play sports and to conduct physical training and drills. It also has science and computer laboratories.

Sports and co-curricular activities
The school encourages co-curricular activities and holds at-least one competition each month. The school's sports team has won many tournaments, one of them being the President Cup.

References

External links
http://www.facebook.com/Aadarshaofficial

Educational institutions established in 2001
Saptari District
Schools in Nepal
2001 establishments in Nepal